Hypnoscope is an instrument intended to determine a person's susceptibility to hypnotic influences.

History 

Plenty of hypnotists, like Mesmer and others, proclaimed that the human body was susceptible to magnetic fields. At the end of XIXth century some psychologists tried to measure human's susceptibility  to hypnosis with magnets. Patient had to put the finger inside the magnetic field, and if he had felt any influence he was considered a hypnable person.

Some psychologists, like Julian Ochorowicz or Gessman created their original hypnoscopes for testing hypnability of their patients. The instrument and the method met some serious criticizm from Frank Podmore and, eventually, psychologists lost their interest.

References

Inventions
Hypnosis